Jason Ceka (born 10 November 1999) is a German professional footballer who plays as a midfielder for  club 1. FC Magdeburg.

After playing youth football for VfB Frohnhausen, Rot-Weiss Essen and Schalke 04, he made his senior debut for Schalke 04 II in 2018 and went on to score 20 goals in 70 games for Schalke 04 II across a three-year spell. He joined 3. Liga side 1. FC Magdeburg in summer 2021.

Club career

Early career
Born in Essen, Ceka started his youth career at VfB Frohnhausen aged 4 before joining Rot-Weiss Essen aged 9. He joined Schalke 04 after four years at Rot-Weiss Essen. He spent the 2016–17 season at Rot-Weiss Essen before returning to  Schalke for the 2017–18 season. He was promoted to the Schalke 04 II team ahead of the 2018–19 season, and scored 8 times in 28 Oberliga Westfalen matches, with Schalke II winning promotion to the Regionalliga West. He made 17 appearances without scoring during the 2019–20 season and scored 12 in 25 matches during the 2020–21 season.

1. FC Magdeburg
In June 2021, Ceka joined 3. Liga club 1. FC Magdeburg on a two-year contract with the option of an extension. He made his debut for the club on 24 July 2021 as a substitute on a 2–0 win over Waldhof Mannheim. He scored his first two goals of the season in consecutive appearances in October 2021, the first coming in a 4–0 win over Türkgücü München and the second in a 3–2 win away to SV Meppen. Following his third goal of the season in a 2–0 win over SC Verl on 7 November 2021, Ceka was compared to Lionel Messi by his teammate Alexander Bittroff; Ceka stated that "das ist ein schönes Kompliment, aber das kann ich nicht ernstnehmen" ("it's a nice compliment, but I can't take it seriously").

International career
Ceka was born in Germany to Albanian parents. He has made one appearance for Germany national under-18 team, coming on as a substitute in a 3–0 win over Austria U18 on 17 April 2017.

References

External links

1999 births
Living people
German footballers
German people of Albanian descent
Footballers from Essen
Association football midfielders
Rot-Weiss Essen players
FC Schalke 04 players
FC Schalke 04 II players
1. FC Magdeburg players
3. Liga players
Regionalliga players
Oberliga (football) players
Germany youth international footballers